"Recovering" is a song recorded by Canadian singer Celine Dion and released as a single on 9 September 2016. It was written by Pink after Dion's husband, René Angélil, died in January 2016.  Entertainment Tonight Canada chose it as one of the best songs of 2016.

Background and release
On 6 July 2016, Dion revealed that Pink wrote a song for her, in honor of her husband René Angélil, who died of cancer in January 2016. She also revealed the title of the song, "Recovering". Dion added that she's already starting to work on an English album. The song was released as a single on 9 September 2016.

Live performances
Dion performed "Recovering" during the Stand Up to Cancer Live Event on 9 September 2016. The telecast aired on more than forty television networks and selected online outlets. It was broadcast live from the Music Center's Walt Disney Concert Hall in Los Angeles. She also performed it on The Ellen DeGeneres Show on 8 September 2016. The episode aired on 12 September 2016. In September 2016, Dion added "Recovering" to the set list of her Las Vegas residency show, Celine. The song was also performed during Dion's 2017 and 2018 tours.

Commercial performance
In Canada, "Recovering" entered the Hot Digital Songs chart at number sixteen. It also topped the Québec Digital Singles Chart for three non-consecutive weeks. In the United States, it debuted on the Pop Digital Songs chart at number twenty-eight. In France, "Recovering" entered the Digital Singles Chart at number forty-nine and the Overall Singles Chart at number fifty.

Credits and personnel
Credits adapted from Discogs.

Alecia Moore – songwriter
Allen Shamblin – songwriter
Tom Douglas – songwriter
Humberto Gatica – producer, engineer, mix
Scott Price – co-producer, programming, piano
John Doelp – executive producer
Vlado Meller – mastering
Martin Nessi – engineer, mix
Charlie Bisharat – concertmaster
Timothy Loo – cello

Charts

Release history

References

External links

2016 singles
2016 songs
2010s ballads
Celine Dion songs
Columbia Records singles
Pop ballads
Commemoration songs
Songs written by Pink (singer)
Songs written by Allen Shamblin
Songs written by Tom Douglas (songwriter)